Bayarban was a village development committee in the Morang District, Koshi Zone of south-eastern Nepal. 
It was named for the village of Bayarban Bazar.
In 2017 it was absorbed by the newly created Kanepokhari Rural Municipality.

Location

Bayarban was in Nepal, Eastern Region, Kosī Zone, Morang.
The Köppen climate classification is Cwa : Monsoon-influenced humid subtropical climate.

Population

At the time of the 1991 Nepal census Bayarban had a population of 20,230.
The table below shows the populations in 2011 of the wards of Kanepokhari Rural Municipality. Bayarban became Wards 3, 4, 6 and 7 when Kanepokhari  was constituted in March 2017.

References

Kanepokhari Rural Municipality